Echiniscus testudo is a cosmopolitan species of tardigrade.

Taxonomy
The species was described by Louis Michel François Doyère in 1840; he placed it in the genus Emydium.

G. Ramazzotti and W. Maucci classified E. filamentos mongoliensis  as a synonym of E. testudo in 1983; this was followed by other tardigradologists. In 2017, Piotr Gąsiorek and colleagues restored it as a distinct taxon and elevated it to species level: E. mongoliensis.

Gąsiorek and colleagues also classified E. filamentosus  and E. glaber  as junior synonyms of E. testudo.

Distribution
It is found throughout most of the Palaearctic, and has been recorded in all continents except Antarctica and Australia. Most reports are Holarctic. Locations where it has been recorded include: Denmark, Egypt, the Faroe Islands, France, Germany, Greece, Greenland, Israel, Italy, Morocco, Iberia, Mongolia, and China.

Doyère based his description off specimens collected in Paris. The neotype designated by Gąsiorek and colleagues was collected in Paris's Montmartre Cemetery. The type localities of the junior synonyms E. bellermanni and E. inermis are both in Germany: the former is Greifswald, and the latter is the Taunus mountains near Frankfurt.

References

testudo
Polyextremophiles
Animals described in 1840